The gltS RNA motif is a conserved RNA structure that was discovered by bioinformatics.
gltS motifs are found in the bacterial lineage Vibrionaceae.

gltS motif RNAs likely function as cis-regulatory elements, in view of their positions upstream of protein-coding genes.  These presumably regulated genes encode subunits of glutamate synthase or a related enzyme (the exact specificity of the enzyme is uncertain).  A glutamine riboswitch was discovered that is often located upstream of glutamate synthase genes, but is also present upstream of other genes, such as those encoding glutamine synthetase and ammonium transporters.

References

Non-coding RNA